Albuñán is a city located in the province of Granada, Spain. According to the 2005 census (INE), the city has a population of 462 inhabitants.

Famous inhabitants
 Mario Gómez, German football player. His paternal family comes from Albuñán. His father emigrated to Germany.

References 

Municipalities in the Province of Granada